is a Japanese television jidaigeki or period drama that was broadcast in 1972–1973. It was the first in the Hissatsu series and is based on  Shōtarō Ikenami's novel Shiokinin Fujieda Baian. Ken Ogata played Fujieda Baian.

Episode 1,2 and 24 were directed by Kinji Fukasaku.

Plot 
Otowaya's official job is an employment agency but also he takes charge of killing villains with money. Otowaya's targets are always villains who escape justice despite their crimes. Fujieda Baian is a doctor but also a professional killer who works for Boss Otowaya in the Edo Underworld.

Nishimura Sanai is a ronin. One day Otowaya Hanemon hires him as a professional killer and he starts working for Otowaya as well as Baian. Baian and Sanai help each other to kill villains.

Cast
 Ken Ogata: Fujieda Baian
 Yoichi Hayashi: Nishimura Sanai
 So Yamamura: Otowaya Hanemon
 Tamao Nakamura: Okura (Hanemon's wife)
 Yumiko Nogawa: Gin
 Rumi Matsumoto: Nishimura Miyo (Nishimura Sanaie's wife)
Masaaki Tsusaka: Misaki no Senzō
Hiroyuki Ota : Mankichi
Takahiro Tamura: Kamiya episode 21,31

Directors
Kinji Fukasaku Episode1,2,24
Kenji Misumi Episode3,4,9,12,21,33
Kazuo Hase Episode18,22,26,29,31

Films
Hissatsu Shikakenin (必殺仕掛人) (1973) Directed by Yousuke Watanabe, screenplay by Yousuke Watanabe and Tetsuro Abe (running time 87 minutes) 
Jiro Tamiya as Fujieda Baian
Koji Takahashi as Nishimura Sanai
So Yamamura as Otowaya Hanemon 
Masaaki Tsusaka as Misaki no Senzo
Yoko Nogiwa as Kichi
Tamio Kawachi as Mogohachi
Hissatsu Shikakenin Baian Arijigoku (必殺仕掛人 梅安蟻地獄) (1973) Directed by Yousuke Watanabe, screenplay by Ichiro Miyagawa (running time 91 minutes) 
Ken Ogata as Fujieda Baian
Yoichi Hayashi as Kosugi Jugoro
So Yamamura as Otowaya Hanemon 
Masaaki Tsusaka as Misaki no Senzo
Kei Satō as Izuya Choubei
Kayo Matsuo as Rin
Asao Koike as Yamazaki Sohaku
Hissatsu Shikakenin Shunsetsu shikakebari (必殺仕掛人 春雪仕掛針) (1974) Directed by Masahiro Sadakata, screenplay by Tetsuro Abe (running time 89 minutes) 
Ken Ogata as Fujieda Baian
Yoichi Hayashi as Kosugi Jugoro
So Yamamura as Otowaya Hanemon 
Shima Iwashita as Chiyo
Isao Natsuyagi as Katsushiro
Takeo Chii 
Kunio Murai

See also
 Hissatsu Shiokinin (2nd in the Hissatsu series)
 Tasukenin Hashiru  (3rd in the Hissatsu series)
 Hissatsu Shiokiya Kagyō (6th in the Hissatsu series)
 Shin Hissatsu Shiokinin (10th in the Hissatsu series)

References

1972 Japanese television series debuts
1970s drama television series
Jidaigeki television series